The 2015 IIHF Women's World Championship Division I was two international ice hockey tournaments organised by the International Ice Hockey Federation. The Division I Group A tournament was played in Rouen, France, from 12 to 18 April 2015, and the Division I Group B tournament was played in Beijing, China, from 6 to 12 April 2015.

Venues

Division I Group A

Participants

Match officials
4 Referees and 8 linesman were selected for the tournament.

Referees
 Zuzana Findurová
 Lisa Grison
 Michaela Kiefer
 Melissa Szkola

Linesman
 Anne Boniface
 Charlotte Girard
 Mirjam Gruber
 Daniela Kiefer
 Anne-Ruth Kuonen
 Justine Todd
 Sueva Torribio
 Jenni Visala

Final standings

Results
All times are local (UTC+2).

Awards and statistics

Awards
Best players selected by the directorate:
 Best Goalkeeper:  Klára Peslarová
 Best Defenseman:  Aneta Tejralová
 Best Forward:  Anna Meixner
Source: IIHF.com

Scoring leaders
List shows the top skaters sorted by points, then goals.

GP = Games played; G = Goals; A = Assists; Pts = Points; +/− = Plus/minus; PIM = Penalties in minutes; POS = Position
Source: IIHF.com

Leading goaltenders
Only the top five goaltenders, based on save percentage, who have played at least 40% of their team's minutes, are included in this list.

TOI = Time on ice (minutes:seconds); SA = Shots against; GA = Goals against; GAA = Goals against average; Sv% = Save percentage; SO = Shutouts
Source: IIHF.com

Division I Group B

Participants

Match officials
4 Referees and 7 linesman were selected for the tournament.

Referees
 Henna Åberg
 Katja Bandlofsky
 Brandy Dewar
 Samantha Hiller

Linesman
 Tanja Cadonau
 Michela Frattarelli
 Tomomi Kaneko
 Stina Nilsson
 Sang Hong
 Gabriela Šťastná
 Harriet Weegh

Final standings

Results
All times are local (UTC+8).

Awards and statistics

Awards
Best players selected by the directorate:
 Best Goalkeeper:  Claudia van Leeuwen
 Best Defenseman:  Franciska Kiss-Simon
 Best Forward:  Zhang Mengying
Source: IIHF.com

Scoring leaders
List shows the top skaters sorted by points, then goals.

GP = Games played; G = Goals; A = Assists; Pts = Points; +/− = Plus/minus; PIM = Penalties in minutes; POS = Position
Source: IIHF.com

Leading goaltenders
Only the top five goaltenders, based on save percentage, who have played at least 40% of their team's minutes, are included in this list.

TOI = Time on ice (minutes:seconds); SA = Shots against; GA = Goals against; GAA = Goals against average; Sv% = Save percentage; SO = Shutouts
Source: IIHF.com

References

External links
 Official website of IIHF

2015 IIHF Women's World Championship
2015
2015
W
World
2015 IIHF Women's World Championship Division I
2015 IIHF Women's World Championship Division I
2015 IIHF Women's World Championship Division I
2015